Cécile Douard  (1866-1941) was a Belgian artist.

Biography
Douard was born Cécile Leseine on 29 December 1866 in Rouen, France.  She studied under . Douard often painted the people and landscape of the coalmining town Borinage.

At the age of 33 Douard lost her sight. No longer able to paint, she became a sculptor. She also played the piano and violin. She wrote two books; "Impressions of a Second Life" in 1923, and  "Paysages indistincts" in 1929. In 1926 she became he president of the Ligue Braille (Braille League). She served in that position until 1937.

Douard died on  14 January 1941 in Brussels, Belgium.

Gallery

References

External links
 

1866 births
1941 deaths
Artists from Rouen
20th-century Belgian women artists